Bonjour Kathrin may refer to:

 Bonjour Kathrin (film), a 1956 German film directed by Karl Anton and starring Caterina Valente
 Bonjour Kathrin – Caterina Valente präsentiert ihre größten Erfolge, a 1965 album by Caterina Valente